HomeExchange.com is a network to facilitate home exchanges.

Each home has a number of points attributed, called "Guestpoints". Members can either do reciprocal exchanges or non-reciprocal exchanges with guestpoints. They earn points by hosting other members, and they can use those to stay at other homes. In order to finalize a reciprocal exchange, members need to activate their annual membership of US$175 (or €149 in Europe) per year, for unlimited exchanges. As of December 2022 homeexchange.com has >100000 members and over 450,000 homes in 159 countries.

History
In 2011, the company was founded as GuestToGuest by Emmanuel Arnaud and 22 families experienced in home exchange.

In 2013, Charles-Edouard Girard joined the company as chairman.

In November 2013, the company acquired Itamos.

In June 2015, the company raised €4 million from Mutuelle d'assurance des instituteurs de France (MAIF).

In March 2017, GuestToGuest merged with HomeExchange.com, founded in 1992 by Ed Kushins, and since 2019 continued under that name.

In 2019, HomeExchange was included on the Next40, the annual selection of the 40 most promising start-ups in France.

External links

References

2011 establishments in France
Cultural exchange
Hospitality services
Online companies of France
Peer-to-peer
Vacation rental